Maiden Peak is a steep-sided shield volcano in the Cascade Range of central Oregon.  It is the highest point in the  distance between Mount Bachelor and Diamond Peak.  Ice Age glaciers carved a large cirque into the northeast flank of the mountain, exposing magma which hardened in the volcano's conduits to form the numerous rock pinnacles now found in the upper part of the cirque.

The summit of Maiden Peak consists of a steeper cinder cone which sits atop the underlying shield volcano.  It is located on the Cascade Crest, which forms the boundary between Lane County and Deschutes County. Also, it is on the boundary between the Deschutes National Forest and the Willamette National Forest. A Forest Service fire lookout tower was built on the summit in 1923, but was removed in 1958.  A  trail zigzags up to the summit from the southwest.

References

Further reading 

 
 
 
 

Shield volcanoes of the United States
Subduction volcanoes
Cascade Volcanoes
Volcanoes of Oregon
Mountains of Oregon
Cascade Range
Mountains of Lane County, Oregon
Volcanoes of Deschutes County, Oregon
Cinder cones of the United States
Mountains of Deschutes County, Oregon
Pleistocene shield volcanoes